F&F may refer to:

Film and television
 Fox & Friends, American daily news/talk program on Fox News Channel
 Fox & Friends First, an early breakfast television news program on Fox News Channel
 Fast and Furious (1939 film), a mystery comedy film directed by Busby Berkeley
 Friends & Family (film), a 2001 gay- and mafia-themed comedy film

Other uses
 F&F Tower, office tower in Panama City
 Friend and Foe, the third release from the Portland, Oregon-based band Menomena
 F&F, a clothes brand by retailer Tesco